Brasa Station is a railway stop on the Zemitāni–Skulte Railway.

References 

Railway stations in Riga